The Fletcher Hills are a low mountain range in the Peninsular Ranges, in southwestern San Diego County, California.

The name Fletcher Hills also refers to a neighborhood near San Diego, California which lies primarily in the city of El Cajon and partially in La Mesa. The area was developed in 1927–1928 by San Diego developer Ed Fletcher.

See also 
Ed Fletcher, namesake of Fletcher Hills

References 

Mountain ranges of San Diego County, California
Peninsular Ranges
Hills of California
El Cajon, California
La Mesa, California
Mountain ranges of Southern California